The Forestry Commission is a Government of Ghana agency under the Ministry of Lands and Natural Resources.

The commission has three divisions and two centres:
 Forest Services Division
 Wildlife Division
 Timber Industry Development Division
 Forestry CommissionTraining Centre
 Resource Management Support Centre

Heads 
 Samuel Afari Dartey
Nii Ashie Kotey
 Kwadwo Owusu Afriyie

References 

Environmental organisations based in Ghana
Ministries and Agencies of State of Ghana